A C2 error, also known as E32 error, is a read error of a Compact Disc. C2 errors can to a degree be recovered by the hardware error detection and correction scheme. A CD drive can have extraction errors when the data on the disc is not readable due to scratches or smudges. The drive can compensate by supplying a "best guess" of what the missing data was, then supplying the missing data. C2 error correction is an analysis over many interleaved frames, an improvement over C1 error correction, which analyzed just one frame, resulting in more accurate data correction. C2 error correction codes are also used by the Digital Audio Tape (DAT) format.

Some copy protection schemes add false C2 errors to discs to discourage copying.

While causing data loss on Video CDs (Mode 2 Form 2) and Audio CDs, individual C2 errors are correctable on data CDs (using Mode 1 and Mode 2 Form 1).

Measurement 

C2 errors can be measured using surface error scanning, and are usually caused by scratches and dirt on the data surface, as well as media degradation.

Error scanning functionality and support varies among vendors and models of optical disc drives.

See also

References

Compact disc
DVD
Optical computer storage media